Government Secondary School may refer to:

 India
 Government Secondary School, Bidsar
 Government Secondary School, Rani

 Nigeria
Government Secondary School, Afikpo
Government Secondary School, Eneka
Government Secondary School, Owerri
Government Secondary School Usha Kadu

 Sierra Leone
Government Secondary School for Boys